A splash screen is a graphical control element consisting of a window containing an image, a logo, and the current version of the software. A splash screen can appear while a game or program is launching. A splash page is an introduction page on a website. A splash screen may cover the entire screen or web page; or may simply be a rectangle near the center of the screen or page. The splash screens of operating systems and some applications that expect to be run in full screen usually cover the entire screen.

Purpose 
Splash screens are typically used by particularly large applications to notify the user that the program is in the process of loading. They provide feedback that a lengthy process is underway. Occasionally, a progress bar within the splash screen indicates the loading progress. A splash screen disappears when the application's main window appears. Splash screens may be added for a period of time and then replaced anew.

Splash screens typically serve to enhance the look and feel of an application or web site, hence they are often visually appealing. They may also have animations, graphics, and sound.

The Java programming language has a specific class for creating splash screens, called java.awt.SplashScreen  that handles standard splash screen functions, e.g. display an image centered on screen that disappears when the first program window opens.

On the Web, a splash screen is a page of a web site that acts as a front page prior to displaying the home page. Designers may use splash pages:

 to direct users to the appropriate website for their country or language preference
 to direct users to a low-bandwidth site or one more accessible to disabled users
 as an additional form of advertising
 to restrict access to content such as pornography, alcohol advertising or sales, or gambling
 as an aesthetic complement to the main page
 to grab someone's attention to take them to a page with more details usually for a product that they are selling.
An early use of the splash screen on a Flash website was to enable the site developer to launch the site in a JavaScript-controlled new window without browser elements such as scroll-bars or an address bar, and in the exact size of the Flash movie. This has gone out of style with the predominance of pop-up blockers. Instead many starting Flash web pages now allow their audience to choose to go to full screen viewing.

Since splash screens often increase the wait for the desired content and may take a long time to load, they are not liked by all users. Web splash screens are especially inconvenient for users with slow internet connections as the first page may take longer to load. Moreover, if the user has turned off rich content, such as images, Flash, or Shockwave, the splash page may not load at all. Splash pages and any associated main pages created in Flash often cannot be accessed by search engines or handled by text readers for the blind.

Splash screens can also be created in HTML and CSS if they are designed for a purpose other than as a loading screen. Instead, they are used for other purposes such as giving the option to pick the language.

See also 
 Bootsplash – splash displayed while booting up the computer
 Interstitial webpage
 Loading screen
 Proxy pattern
 Splash page – comic book terminology

References

External links

 A collection of Microsoft Windows splash screens since version 1.01.
 Information on how to program splash screens.
 Screenshots of many different applications' splash screens, including previous versions.
 Information on how to remove various splash screens.
 Program that removes the majority of splash screens on Windows.
 Simple tool that allows you to create all “Splash Screens” for iOS & Android Apps in one click.

Graphical control elements